Grant David "Knobby" Warwick was a professional ice hockey right winger who played 9 seasons in the National Hockey League. He won the Calder Memorial Trophy in 1942. Grant is the brother of Bill Warwick.

Playing career

NHL career
Born in Regina, Saskatchewan, Warwick started playing with the hometown team Regina Abbots in the Southern Saskatchewan Junior Hockey League. He gradually made his way up to the Regina Rangers of the Southern Saskatchewan Hockey League and won an Allan Cup with the team in 1940–41.

Warwick made his NHL debut with the New York Rangers in 1941–42. In his first season of play, he was awarded the Calder Memorial Trophy for top rookie in the league. In 1947–48 after seven seasons with the Rangers and playing in the 1947 NHL All-Star Game, Warwick was traded to the Boston Bruins for Billy Taylor and future considerations. The Bruins kept Warwick until 1948–49, when he was traded to the Montreal Canadiens. Early in the season in 1949–50, Warwick broke his nose and spent the rest of the season in the American Hockey League with the Buffalo Bisons.

OSHL career
Warwick would not return to the NHL again. He spent two more seasons with the Bisons before moving on to the Maritime Major Hockey League for one season. The next season, Warwick moved on to the Okanagan Senior Hockey League and played for the Penticton Vees. He had great success with the V's and was selected to the OSHL First All-Star Team four times in his four seasons of play. Warwick also won his second Allan Cup in 1953–54 with the V's.

In 1955, the Penticton Vees were chosen to represent Team Canada at the World Ice Hockey Championships. Warwick at the time was a player and also the coach. The Vees made it all the way to the gold medal game where they faced off against the Soviet Union. Warwick and his team beat the Soviet Union 5–0 to win the gold medal.

After the gold medal victory, Warwick spent one more season with the Vees before moving on with the Trail Smoke Eaters of the Western International Hockey League. He stayed in Trail for only one season before returning to the OSHL. Warwick would retire after playing 49 games with the Kamloops Chiefs.

Awards and achievements
Allan Cup champion in 1941 and 1954.
Calder Memorial Trophy winner in 1942.
Played in 1947 NHL All-Star Game.
Selected to the OSHL First All-Star Team in 1953, 1954, 1955, and 1956.
Inducted into the Saskatchewan Sports Hall of Fame.
Inducted into the Regina Sports Hall of Fame.

Career statistics

Regular season and playoffs

International

References

External links

 

1921 births
1999 deaths
Boston Bruins players
Calder Trophy winners
Canada men's national ice hockey team coaches
Canadian ice hockey right wingers
Sportspeople from Regina, Saskatchewan
Montreal Canadiens players
New York Rangers players
Ice hockey people from Saskatchewan